Signal to Noise is a graphic novel written by Neil Gaiman and illustrated by Dave McKean. It was originally serialised in the UK style magazine The Face, beginning in 1989, and collected as a graphic novel in 1992, published by Victor Gollancz Ltd in the UK and by Dark Horse Comics in the US.

The story follows a film-maker who suffers from a terminal illness, and imagines a last film which he will never have time to make. It examines the relationship between apocalyptic imagery, and the central character's personal disaster.

There have been three adaptations of the graphic novel into other media: 
 in 1996, Gaiman adapted his own story for a BBC radio broadcast, with music by McKean;
 in 1999, a stage adaptation written by Marc Rosenbush and Robert Toombs was mounted in Chicago with Gaiman's cooperation.
 in 2002, McKean adapted it into a 14-minute film, with Heathcote Williams as the director.

Notes

Comics by Neil Gaiman
1989 comics debuts
1992 graphic novels
Apocalyptic comics
Eisner Award winners for Best Graphic Album: New